Zhao Chuandong is a Chinese pilot selected as part of the Shenzhou program. A fighter pilot in the People's Liberation Army Air Force, he was selected to be an astronaut in 1998.

References

Shenzhou program
Living people
People's Liberation Army Astronaut Corps
Year of birth missing (living people)
Place of birth missing (living people)